Taiwanese singer-songwriter William Wei has released six studio albums, one live album, two EPs, thirty six singles. Wei makes his musical debut on CTS variety show Happy Sunday (快樂星期天). Subsequently, he signed a multi-album contract with Linfair Records and released his first EP, Slowly Wait (慢慢等) in 2009.

In 2010, Wei released his self-titled debut album, William Wei. In the following year, Wei held his first major concert at the Taipei International Convention Center, and released his first live album, The Fleeing of a Two-Legged Bookcase.

In 2012, Wei released his second EP, The Bird Who Saved The World, and his sophomore album, Someone Is Waiting. Wei's third studio album, Journey Into The Night, was released in 2014 and was inspired by the Ang Lee's movie, Life of Pi. Wei's fourth studio album, It All Started From An Intro, was released on 16 August 2016.

After almost 4 years, Wei released his fifth studio album, Sounds of My Life on 29 April 2020. He released his sixth studio album, which is his first full-length English album, I'm More Sober When I'm Drunk on 24 December 2021.

Album

Studio albums

Live album

Extended plays

Single

As main artist

Other appearances

Appearances in soundtrack albums

Appearances in albums by other artists

Others

Music videos

As main artist

As featuring artist

Guest appearance

Songwriting credits 
Wei has written songs for many singers including Jolin Tsai, FanFan, Aska Yang and Angela Zhang. Before Wei debuted as a singer, he has been writing songs for other artists. His first published work was 'Little Eyes' (小眼睛) by FanFan in 2007.

References

Discographies of Taiwanese artists
Mandopop discographies